General Arcadio Maxílom y Molero (November 13, 1862 – August 10, 1924) was a Filipino teacher and hero of the Philippine Revolution.

He was born in Tuburan, Cebu to Roberto Maxílom, the town gobernadorcillo, and Gregoria Molero. His family were members of the local gentry, or principalía. He worked as a teacher in the local school before joining the Katipunan, whose activities in Cebu were led by a young Negrense, León Kilat.

After Kilat's betrayal and assassination, Maxílom continued the revolution in Cebu. Under his command, the Katipunan was able to regroup in the central highlands, which Spanish forces found impenetrable. On December 16, 1898, Maxílom wrote a letter to the Spanish authorities in Cebu, demanding that the latter surrender. Weary after incessant fighting, the Spaniards quickly responded, asking Maxílom for two to three days to leave the province. By Christmas Eve, the Spaniards had left, leaving behind only three Catholic clerics.  However, in the Treaty of Paris that ended the Spanish–American War, signed that month, December 1898, Spain ceased its sovereignty over the Philippine Islands to the United States for twenty million dollars, although American acceptance of this treaty would still be subject to the decision of the US Congress.

Maxílom is best remembered for stubbornly refusing to surrender to the American forces even as his fellow revolutionaries in Manila and Cebu were starting to capitulate or collaborate with the new invaders. He surrendered on October 27, 1901.

Maxílom died in his hometown of Tuburan, after a long bout with paralysis, on August 10, 1924. His funeral cortège, joined in by leading revolutionary figures including Emilio Aguinaldo, stretched some four kilometers, in what remains to this day the longest in Cebu's history.

Mango Avenue, one of main thoroughfares Cebu City, was renamed General Maxílom Avenue in honor of the general.

References

Sources

 
 
 

 
 

1862 births
1924 deaths
Cebuano people
Filipino schoolteachers
Filipino generals
People from Cebu
People of the Philippine–American War
People of the Philippine Revolution
Politicians with disabilities
Katipunan members
20th-century Filipino educators
19th-century Filipino educators